The Aramean flag or Syriac-Aramean flag (Syriac:  ܐܬܐ ܣܘܪܝܝܬܐ ʾOtho Suryayto) is the ethnic flag designated for the Arameans, intended to represent their nation and homeland as well as the Aramean diaspora. A first version, similar to the current one, was developed in 1980 by Bahro Suryoyo ("Syriac light"), a Syriac-Aramean journal part of the Syriac federation in Sweden. The current version was developed in early 1982. 

The World Council of Arameans, an international non-government umbrella organization, which is recognized by the United Nations officially choose the flag to represent the Syriac-Aramean nation worldwide on 16 July 1983 in New Jersey. The design was based on the Winged Sun symbol, replacing the sun by a torch symbolising the Holy Spirit in Christianity.

Symbolism
The design is specifically based on a relief depicting Gilgamesh between two bull-men supporting a winged sun disk, excavated in 1927 by the German archaeologist Max von Oppenheim (1860-1946) and the French semitologist André Dupont-Sommer (1900-1983) at Tell Halaf the former Aramean city-state of Bit Bahiani which is located on the border of Tur Abdin region, today located in the Al Hasakah governorate of northeastern Syria. The relief was part of the entrance of the palace of the Aramean king Kapara.  

The main characteristic of the flag is the eagle, which stands for strength and power. The sun disk is replaced by a flame to symbolize the holy spirit and the Christian heritage of the Arameans. The four stars represent the rivers in the Aramean homeland: Tigris, Euphrates, Gihon and Pishon. The red background of the flag was chosen to represent the blood that was spilled during the Aramean genocide. The yellow color represents the hope of an independent Aramean state.  It is intended to represent "the Aramean (Syriac) nation in the Aramean homeland and in the Aramean diaspora".

Gallery

See also 
 Arameans
 Syriac Christianity
 World Council of Arameans (Syriacs)
 Aramean Democratic Organization

References

Ethnic flags
Aramean culture
Assyrian culture
Religious flags
Flags of indigenous peoples
Flags introduced in 1980
Aramean